Sweet As is an Australian coming-of-age drama film, directed by Jub Clerc and released in 2022. The film stars Shantae Barnes-Cowan as Murra, an Indigenous Australian girl from a troubled family who discovers a passion for photography while participating in a youth retreat.

The cast also includes Mark Coles Smith, Ngaire Pigram, Carlos Sanson Jr, Pedrea Jackson, Mikayla Levy, Andrew Wallace and Tasma Walton.

The film premiered in August 2022 at the Melbourne International Film Festival, where Clerc won the Innovation Award. It had its international premiere at the 2022 Toronto International Film Festival, where it won the NETPAC Award for best film from the Asia/Pacific region.

References

External links

2022 films
2022 drama films
Australian coming-of-age drama films
Films about Aboriginal Australians
2020s Australian films